This list of Naga languages includes various Sino-Tibetan languages spoken by the Naga peoples. Most of the native languages are group under Naga languages whereas Northern Naga languages fall under Sal languages. Both Sal languages and Kuki-Chin-Naga languages are classified as a Central Tibeto-Burman languages.

Angami-Pochuri

Angami languages are:
Angami
Chokri (Chakri, Chakhesang) 
Kheza (Chakhesang)
Mao (Sopvoma)
Poula (Poumai)

Pochuri languages are:
Pochuri
Ntenyi (Northern Rengma)
Rengma
Sumi languages are:
Sümi or Sema

Central Naga 

Ao language
Chungli Ao
Mongsen Ao
Changki
Dordar (Yacham)
Longla
Lotha (Lhota)
Sangtam ('Thukumi')
Kizare
Pirr (Northern Sangtam)
Phelongre
Thukumi (Central Sangtam)
Photsimi
Purr (Southern Sangtam)
Yimchingric
Yimkhiungrü ('Yachumi')
Tikhir
Chirr
Phanungru
Langa
Para
Makuric
Makury
Long Phuri

Koki is a "Naga" languages spoken in and around Leshi Township, Myanmar that could possibly classify as Tangkhulic languages or Ao languages.

Northern Naga

Konyak–Chang
Konyak 
Chang 
Wancho 
Phom
Khiamniungic 
Khiamniungan 
Leinong 
Makyam 
Ponyo

Tangsa–Nocte
Tangsa (Tase) 
Muklom
Pangwa Naga
Ponthai
Tikhak
Nocte 
Bote Naga
Hakhi Naga
Hakhun
Hame Naga
Hasik Naga
Hathim Naga
Khapa
Laju (Ollo Naga)
Lama Naga
Tutsa

The Singpho language  is sometimes included due to its proximity to Tangshang Naga.

Southern Naga  

Anal
Chiru
Chothe
Kharam
Koireng
Kom
Lamkang
Monsang
Moyon
Purum
Sorbung (Tangkhul)
Tarao

Tangkhul-Maring  

Tangkhulic languages include:
Tangkhul 
Somra 
Akyaung Ari
Kachai
Huishu
Tusom
Maringic languages
Khoibu
Maring

Western Naga 

Zeme proper
Mzieme (Northern Zeme)
Liangmai
Rongmei
Inpui (Puiron)
Khoirao (Thangal)
Maram

See also
Nagamese Creole

References

Naga-related lists
Naga people

Naga